Puthukkad is a town on the banks of Kurumali River, also known as Mupliyam  River, in Kerala. The National highway NH 544 passes through thi town.

Transportation
Puthukkad railway station is on the Irinjalakuda-Thrissur railway line. Both KSRTC and private bus services connect Puthukkad to Thrissur, Amballur, Mannuthy and Palakkad in the north, Kodakara, Irinjalakuda, Chalakudy, and South Thorave, Near Pudukad Railway Station and Ernakulam in the south, Palazhi and Thottippal in the west and Mupliyam and Chengaloor in the east.

Educational institutions
 St Antony's Higher Secondary School
 Mary Matha I.C.S.E School
 Prajyoti Niketan College
 Govt Vocational Highschool
 MCA centre of Calicut University

Demographics
 India census, Puthukkad had a population of 12,500. Males constitute 48% of the population and females 52%. Pudukkad has an average literacy rate of 84%, higher than the national average of 59.5%: male literacy is 85%, and female literacy is 83%. In Pudukkad, 11% of the population is under 6 years of age.

Personalities
 Chelat Achutha Menon, former Chief Minister of Kerala.
 C. Raveendranath, former Minister of Education.

References

External links 

Timeline of Thrissur
 http://www.pudukad.com

Cities and towns in Thrissur district